Cliona celata, occasionally called the boring sponge, is a species of demosponge belonging the family Clionaidae. It is found worldwide. The sponge itself is often visible as a rather featureless yellow or orange lump at the bottom of the hole.

Habitat 
These sponges are common in southern New England and in Narragansett Bay. They also live in the Bahamas and the western Atlantic Ocean. They usually  live in lagoons or on reefs. They will sometimes make their home on dead mollusks or other shelled creatures.

Reproduction 
This animal can reproduce asexually and sexually. They can simply separate by mitosis, as single cells do, or they can release sperm into the water in hopes of them finding a female's eggs. They may also attach their larvae onto mollusks like clams and mussels. This usually results in the death of the host. They then will begin to grow and colonize. .

References 

 
 Browse Species Library
Taxonomicon 
North East Atlantic Taxa

External links
 

Animals described in 1826
Hadromerida